Glomerula is a genus of polychaete worm in the family Sabellidae. It differs from all other Sabellidae in having a calcareous tube and spinose setae. Only one living species, G. piloseta, is known from Lizard Island, Great Barrier Reef, Australia.
 The oldest fossils of Glomerula are known from the Early Jurassic and their tube microstructure has remained unchanged since then.

References

Sabellida
Extant Early Jurassic first appearances